Denis Dasoul (20 July 1983 in Belgium – 4 November 2017 in Indonesia) was a Belgian footballer.

References

Belgian footballers
1983 births
Association football midfielders
Association football defenders
Belgian expatriate footballers
Expatriate footballers in Italy
Expatriate footballers in Austria
A.C. Perugia Calcio players
K.R.C. Genk players
SW Bregenz players
Royal Antwerp F.C. players
Calcio Foggia 1920 players
C.S. Visé players
S.E.F. Torres 1903 players
U.S. Città di Jesolo players
2017 deaths
Caroline Springs George Cross FC players